Maryland Route 312 (MD 312) is a state highway in the U.S. state of Maryland.  The state highway runs  from MD 404 near Ridgely north to MD 313 at Baltimore Corner.  MD 312 traverses northwestern Caroline County, connecting Ridgely with Bridgetown.  The highway's first section was paved around Ridgely in the 1910s.  The highway was completed from MD 404 to Ridgely in the mid-1920s and from north of Ridgely to Baltimore Corner in the late 1920s.

Route description

MD 312 begins at a superstreet intersection with MD 404 (Shore Highway) between the towns of Hillsboro and Denton.  The roadway continues south as county-maintained Log Cabin Road.  MD 312 heads north as two-lane undivided Downes Station Road, passing through farmland until it curves to the east and meets MD 480 (Ridgely Road) on a tangent, joining that highway in a concurrency.  After MD 776 (Sunset Boulevard), the old alignment of MD 312, splits to the north, MD 312 and MD 480 enter the town of Ridgely and the highway's name changes to Sixth Street.  MD 312 leaves MD 480 by turning north onto Central Avenue, a two-lane street with very wide shoulders used for angle or perpendicular parking.  The state highway intersects an abandoned railroad grade owned by the Maryland Department of Transportation after meeting the other end of MD 776 (Railroad Avenue).  MD 312 leaves the town of Ridgely shortly after passing west of Ridgely Elementary School.  The state highway continues north through farmland as Oakland Road, passing west of Ridgely Airpark and through the hamlet of Oakland.  MD 312 intersects the eastern terminus of MD 304 (Bridgetown Road) in Bridgetown and passes through a forested area before reaching its northern terminus at MD 313 (Goldsboro Road) at Baltimore Corner.

History
The first section of MD 312 was paved through Ridgely and north about  toward Oakland by 1921.  That highway was extended to Oakland by 1923.  The state highway was constructed between MD 404 at Long's School House Corner and Ridgely in 1924 and 1925.  The remainder of the highway through Bridgetown to MD 313 at Baltimore Corner was constructed between 1926 and 1929.  MD 312 originally followed Sunset Boulevard and Railroad Avenue through Ridgely, rejoining the present route at Railroad Avenue's intersection with Central Avenue, which headed south as MD 480.  In 1953, Sixth Street was completed between Sunset Boulevard and Central Avenue.  MD 312 and MD 480, which was later extended west to Hillsboro, were assigned to the new road and MD 312 replaced MD 480 on Central Avenue.

Junction list

See also

References

External links

MDRoads: MD 312
MD 312 at AARoads.com

312
Maryland Route 312